Wajid may refer to:

Al-Wājid (Arabic: الواجد), one of the names of God in Islam, meaning "Perceiver" or "Unfailing"
Wajid (name), male given name of Arabic origin (includes a list of people with this name)

Wajid, Indian film musician, one half of the duo Sajid–Wajid

Wajid, Somalia (sometimes Waajid or Wajiid), city in the Bakool region of Somalia
Wajid District, Somalia

 Another name for wajik, a traditional Asian sweet

See also
 Wajid Ali (disambiguation)

Names of God in Islam